Esraa Osama Fathi Awad (born 1 December 1986) is an Egyptian footballer who plays as a midfielder. She has been a member of the Egypt women's national team.

Club career
Awad has played for Elamyeen in Egypt.

International career
Awad capped for Egypt at senior level during the 2016 Africa Women Cup of Nations.

References

1986 births
Living people
Egyptian women's footballers
Women's association football midfielders
Egypt women's international footballers